Dmitry Georgievich Saltsman  (born on 1 November 1974) is a retired Tajikistani footballer.

Career statistics

Club

International

Statistics accurate as of match played 1 December 1998

International goals
Scores and results list Tajikistan's goal tally first.

References

External links
 
 

1974 births
Living people
Tajikistani footballers
Tajikistan international footballers
Footballers at the 1998 Asian Games
Association football midfielders
Asian Games competitors for Tajikistan
Soviet footballers
Vakhsh Qurghonteppa players
FC Zenit-2 Saint Petersburg players
FC Dynamo Saint Petersburg players
Tajikistani expatriate footballers
Expatriate footballers in Russia
FC Sheksna Cherepovets players